The Fergus Devils were a Junior ice hockey team based in Fergus, Ontario, Canada.  They played in the former Georgian Mid-Ontario Junior C Hockey League (now a part of the PJHL),. Took a "Leave of Absence for the 2015/16 season and have not returned.

History
The Fergus Green Machine were founded in 1971 in the South-Central Junior D Hockey League.  In 1973, the league was promoted to the Central Ontario Junior C Hockey League.  In 1974, the team seemed to have dropped off the map, but it turns out they had probably dropped to the fairly local Northern Junior D Hockey League.  In 1979-80, while in the Northern, the Green Machine picked up a 16-year-old Scottish defenseman named James Stephen Smith.  Smith led the team to a league championship, and all the way to the Ontario Hockey Association Cup final against the Belmont Bombers of the Western Ontario Junior D Hockey League.  The Bombers knocked off the Machine 2-games-to-none in a best-of-3 series to win the All-Ontario championship.  Smith went on to play three seasons of Ontario Hockey League hockey with the London Knights before eventually winning three Stanley Cups with the National Hockey League's Edmonton Oilers.

In 1983, the Green Machine returned to their old Junior "C" loop, now known as the Mid-Ontario Junior C Hockey League.  The Northern Junior D Hockey League folded two seasons later without the Fergus franchise.  In 1987 the Green Machine folded.

In 1990, the town of Fergus resurrected the team as the Fergus Devils.  Still in the Mid-Ontario Junior C Hockey League, the Devils played two seasons of interlock with the Western Junior C Hockey League.  Two years later, the Mid-Ontario merged with the Georgian Bay Junior C Hockey League to form the Georgian Mid-Ontario Junior C Hockey League.  It is unknown if the Devils won any Mid-Ontario championships.  The Devils found their niche in the new league and won the league title in 1995, 1999, 2000, and 2001.  The Devils have never reached the Clarence Schmalz Cup finals.

The 2005-06 season saw the Devils finish in second play in the Georgian Mid-Ontario.  In the league quarter-final, the Devils laid out the seventh-seeded Bradford Bulls 4 games to none.  With a head of steam, the Devils played the fourth seeded Erin Shamrocks in the semi-final.  The result was a 4-games-to-1 series win for the Devils.  In the finals, the Devils locked horns with the first seed Penetang Kings.  The Devils were no match for the Kings as Penetang swept the series 4-games-to-none to win the league championship.  The Kings went on to win the Clarence Schmalz Cup.

In 2006-07, a late season surge saw the Fergus Devils surpass the Alliston Hornets and Penetang Kings to gain the top seed in the league.  As the Bradford Bulls had left the league to try their chances on an Independent Junior A league, the Devils received a bye in the league quarter-finals.  The well rested Devils took on the fifth seeded Stayner Siskins in the league semi-final and beat them 4-games-to-1.  Again in the finals, the Devils again faced the Penetang Kings.  The Kings went up 2-games-to-none on the Devils with a pair of double overtime victories.  The Devils came back ane won game 3 and 4 just to lose game 5 and 6.  For the second straight year the Penetang Kings beat the Devils for the league title and again went on to win the Clarence Schmalz Cup.

Folded following the 2014/15 season.

Season-by-season standings

2000-2004
2004–Present

Notable alumni
James Stephen Smith
Chris Driscoll (NLL Pro lacrosse player)
Greg Jacina

References

External links
Devils' Webpage

Georgian Mid-Ontario Junior C Hockey League teams
Centre Wellington
1971 establishments in Ontario
Ice hockey clubs established in 1971